The River's End is a 1920 American silent Western drama film directed by Victor Heerman and Marshall Neilan and starring Lewis Stone, Marjorie Daw, and Jane Novak. It is an adaptation of the 1919 novel of the same name by James Oliver Curwood.

The film's sets were designed by the art director Ben Carré.

Plot summary

Cast
 Lewis Stone as Derwent Conniston / John Keith  
 Marjorie Daw as Mary Josephine  
 Jane Novak as Miriam Kirkstone  
 J. Barney Sherry as McDowell  
 George Nichols as Judge Kirkstone  
 Charles West as Peter Kirkstone  
 Togo Yamamoto as Shan Tung

References

Bibliography
 Goble, Alan. The Complete Index to Literary Sources in Film. Walter de Gruyter, 1999.

External links

 
 
 
 

1920 films
1920 Western (genre) films
1920s English-language films
Films directed by Victor Heerman
Films directed by Marshall Neilan
First National Pictures films
American black-and-white films
Northern (genre) films
Films based on American novels
Royal Canadian Mounted Police in fiction
Films based on novels by James Oliver Curwood
Silent American Western (genre) films
1920s American films